Pamela Leora Spratlen (born 1954) is a U.S. diplomat. She is the former United States Ambassador to Uzbekistan and United States Ambassador to Kyrgyzstan.

Early life and education
Pamela Spratlen was born in Columbus, Ohio and was raised in Washington state and California. Her father, Thaddeus Spratlen, was a professor in the Department of Marketing at the University of Washington’s School of Business. As a younger man, Thaddeus Spratlen also applied to join the Foreign Service, but was blocked by more racially restrictive hiring policies by the State Department at that time. Pamela Spratlen's mother, Lois Price Spratlen, was an associate professor and ombudsman at the University of Washington's School of Nursing.

Pamela Spratlen graduated from Crenshaw High School in Los Angeles in 1972. Spratlen earned her bachelor's degree from Wellesley College in 1976. She also has master's degrees from the United States Army War College and the University of California, Berkeley. Spratlen speaks Russian, French, and Spanish.

Career
Prior to joining the Foreign Service, Spratlen volunteered for Volunteers in Service to America and served for almost nine years as a staff member in the California State Legislature.

Spratlen joined the Foreign Service in 1990. Her first tour as a Foreign Service Officer was in Guatemala (1990–1992). Her past assignments include the U.S. Mission to the Organization of American States (1992–1994), the U.S. Mission to the Organisation for Economic Co-operation and Development (1995–1998), and the Executive Secretariat (1999–2000). She has also served as Assistance Coordinator at the U.S. embassy in Moscow (2002–2004), Special Assistant to the Counselor of the Department of State (2005–2006), Director of Central Asian Affairs (2006–2007), Director of Western European Affairs (2007–2008), and Deputy Chief of Mission at the U.S. embassy in Astana, Kazakhstan. She served as the United States Ambassador to Kyrgyzstan from 2011 to 2014. Most recently, she was named as the Department of State's official overseeing the response to the so-called "Havana Syndrome", but was replaced after being accused of failing to take the incidents seriously enough.

Spratlen was nominated by President Barack Obama on July 28, 2014, and confirmed by the Senate on November 20, 2014. She was sworn in as United States Ambassador to Uzbekistan on December 18, 2014.

Spratlen has received several Meritorious and Superior Honor Awards from the State Department.

Personal life
One of Spratlen's sisters, Pat Spratlen Etem, was a member of the 1980 and 1984 Olympic rowing teams.

References

|-

1954 births
African-American diplomats
Ambassadors of the United States to Kyrgyzstan
Ambassadors of the United States to Uzbekistan
Living people
People from Columbus, Ohio
People from Los Angeles
United States Army War College alumni
University of California, Berkeley alumni
Wellesley College alumni
United States Foreign Service personnel
American women ambassadors
Crenshaw High School alumni
21st-century African-American people
21st-century African-American women
20th-century African-American people
20th-century African-American women
Military personnel from California